Christ Hospital is in Jersey City, New Jersey. It is affiliated with Hoboken University Medical Center and the Bayonne Medical Center. It is one of the six hospitals in Hudson County, New Jersey operated by the for-profit organization Hudson Hospital Opco, known as Care Point Health. According to a study conducted by National Nurses United and released in January 2014, the hospital was the 9th most expensive in the state, charging 763% above costs.

History
It was founded in 1872 in Jersey City, New Jersey and was originally associated with the Episcopal Diocese of Newark.

The Christ Hospital School of Nursing was established in 1890 and since 1999 has run a cooperative program with Hudson County Community College. In 2014 it merged with the Bayonne Medical Center nursing school.

In 2011 it was announced that the hospital would be sold to Prime Healthcare Services. The proposed sale was the focus of significant community concern, generated competing offers, and Prime Healthcare's original offer was withdrawn on February 1, 2012. The hospital filed for bankruptcy proceedings in 2012, and was eventually awarded to what was deemed the highest bidder for $43.5 million.

Deaths
Adolph Lankering (1851-1937), mayor of Hoboken, New Jersey.
Maddie Blaustein (1960-2008), voice actress

References

External links

Community campaign to Save Christ Hospital

Buildings and structures in Jersey City, New Jersey
Episcopal Diocese of Newark
Hospitals established in 1872
Hospitals in Hudson County, New Jersey
1872 establishments in New Jersey